Julien Van Campenhout (20 February 1898 – 26 August 1933) was a Belgian long-distance runner. He competed in the men's 5000 metres at the 1920 Summer Olympics.

References

External links
 

1898 births
1933 deaths
Athletes (track and field) at the 1920 Summer Olympics
Belgian male long-distance runners
Olympic athletes of Belgium
Place of birth missing
Olympic cross country runners